Humans of Bombay (HoB) is an Indian photoblog about people in Mumbai (previously known as Bombay). It was started in 2014 by Karishma Mehta. It is inspired by Humans of New York (HoNY). With her team, Mehta documents the stories of individuals and showcases it to the world through social media posts and a website.

Development
Inspired by the Humans of New York (HoNY) website, Karishma Mehta started Humans of Bombay in January 2014, by traveling around Mumbai and asking people questions about their lives and for permission to take and upload their photographs and their answers to her website. By April 2014, the Facebook page had more than 135 posts and almost 40,000 followers. By November 2015, the page had reached 4 lakh followers.

By 2015, Mehta began using the page to conduct fundraising campaigns, including for Kranti, an organization that supports the daughters of sex workers, and collected Rs. 6.5 lakhs for Kranti in one day. In 2015, Humans of Bombay featured the story and picture of a girl speaking out against child marriage, that within two days gained over 60,000 likes on Facebook, and created an opportunity for Humans of Bombay to promote Aangan, the child protection organization supporting the girl. A crowdfunding campaign for a child with blood cancer raised Rs 10.31 lakh within days.

By 2016, Mehta moved the blog to humansofbombay.in, and self-published the book Humans of Bombay. By then, the blog had covered a wide range of subjects, from everyday interactions to topics such as depression, alcoholism, domestic violence, child sexual abuse, Sapna Bhavnani discussing her gang-rape, and people sharing their own stories and support for others. Fundraising campaigns continued on the website, including in 2017, raising Rs 11 lakh within four days on behalf of the daughter of a sex worker  to support her education at New York University.

By 2018, Humans of Bombay had grown to six permanent employees, expanded beyond Mumbai, and established an Instagram page with what Aishwarya Upadhye of The Hindu described as "Stories that make you grin from ear to ear, stories that would give you pangs of guilt, the ones that would make you well up, those that cement your belief in hope and survival," and Sadaf Shaikh of Verve described as "all kinds of stories – some that plaster a big grin on your face, others that elicit a quick prayer for having a privileged life."

Details
Marine Drive was the first location chosen in 2014 and from there now they have covered thousands of people in Mumbai including Ratan Tata, Narendra Modi, Nawazuddin Siddiqui, Rajkummar Rao, Kareena Kapoor Khan, Boman Irani, Anupam Kher, Kartik Aaryan, Sunil Chhetri, Milind Soman, Sapna Bhavnani, Kajol and Ajay Devgan, and Devika Rotawan. Topics include acid attacks, sex workers, domestic violence and inter-caste love stories. Humans of Bombay published a first-hand account of a Jamia student talking about the Citizenship Amendment Bill (CAA) and the Jamia attack. In 2021, a post by actress Sanjana Sanghi was removed after protests on social media over the content of her post featuring domestic workers.

Publications

See also
Everyday Mumbai

References

External links 

 Humans of Bombay website

Culture of Mumbai
Indian photography websites
Photoblogs
Indian blogs